In economics, a complete market (aka Arrow-Debreu market or complete system of markets) is a market with two conditions:

 Negligible transaction costs and therefore also perfect information,
 Every asset in every possible state of the world has a price.

In such a market, the complete set of possible bets on future states of the world can be constructed with existing assets without friction. Here, goods are state-contingent; that is, a good includes the time and state of the world in which it is consumed. For instance, an umbrella tomorrow if it rains is a distinct good from an umbrella tomorrow if it is clear. The study of complete markets is central to state-preference theory. The theory can be traced to the work of Kenneth Arrow (1964), Gérard Debreu (1959), Arrow & Debreu (1954) and Lionel McKenzie (1954). Arrow and Debreu were awarded the Nobel Memorial Prize in Economics (Arrow in 1972, Debreu in 1983), largely for their work in developing the theory of complete markets and applying it to the problem of general equilibrium.

States of the world 
A state of the world is a complete specification of the values of all relevant variables over the relevant time horizon. A state-contingent claim, or state claim, is a contract whose future payoffs depend on future states of the world. For example, suppose you can bet on the outcome of a coin toss. If you guess the outcome correctly, you will win one dollar, and otherwise you will lose one dollar. A bet on heads is a state claim, with payoff of one dollar if heads is the outcome, and payoff of negative one dollar if tails is the outcome. "Heads" and "tails" are the states of the world in this example. A state-contingent claim can be represented as a payoff vector with one element for each state of the world, e.g. (payoff if heads, payoff if tails). So a bet on heads can be represented as ($1, −$1) and a bet on tails can be represented as (−$1, $1). Notice that by placing one bet on heads and one bet on tails, you have a state-contingent claim of ($0, $0); that is, the payoff is the same regardless of which state of the world occurs.

The bet on a coin toss is a simplistic example but illustrates widely applicable concepts, especially in finance. If markets are complete, it is possible to arrange a portfolio with any conceivable payoff vector. That is, the state claims available for purchase, represented as payoff vectors, span the payoff space. A pure security or simple contingent claim is a state claim that pays off in only one state. Any state-contingent claim can be regarded as a collection of pure securities. A system of markets is complete if and only if the number of attainable pure securities equals the number of possible states. This is equivalent to stating that for a complete market, all cash flows for a trading strategy can be replicated using a similar synthetic trading strategy. Because a trading strategy can be simplified into a set of simple contingent claims (strategies paying 1 in one state and 0 in every other state), a complete market can be generalized as the ability to replicate cash flows of all simple contingent claims.

Dynamically-complete market 
In order for a market to be complete, it must be possible to instantaneously enter into any position  regarding any future state of the market.  In contrast, a market is called dynamically complete if it is possible to construct a self-financing trading strategy that will have the same cash-flow.  In other words, a complete market allows you to  place all of your bet at once, while a dynamically complete market may require that you execute subsequent trades after making your initial investment.  The requirement that the strategy be self-financing means that subsequent trades must be cash-flow neutral (you cannot contribute or withdraw any additional funds).  Any complete market is also dynamically complete.

See also 
Incomplete markets

References

Further reading 
 Mark D. Flood (1991), "An Introduction to Complete Markets", Federal Reserve Bank of St. Louis, Review, March/April 1991
Mathematical finance